Campylocera is a genus of flies in the family Pyrgotidae.

Species

References 

Pyrgotidae
Diptera of Africa
Taxa named by Pierre-Justin-Marie Macquart